Dylan Taylor (born July 9, 1981) is a Canadian actor.

Career
Taylor's most notable television roles are Steve Wassenfelder, an out of shape theoretical physicist on the TV series Defying Gravity, Andrew O'Brien on BBC America's original series Copper and Bryan Ingram on Slasher.

Filmography

Film

Television

Video game

References

External links

1981 births
Living people
Canadian male television actors
Canadian male film actors
Canadian male voice actors
Male actors from Toronto